Harold John Fleming (30 April 1887 – 23 August 1955) was an English footballer who played as an inside forward for Swindon Town and the England national team. He is the only Swindon Town player to have featured for England.

Club career
Fleming began his career at St. Marks before being invited for a trial at Swindon Town by manager Sam Allen. He joined the club in 1907. Fleming scored a brace in a 4–0 win over Salisbury and was swiftly signed on a full-time basis.

Fleming became a Swindon Town legend scoring 203 times in 332 games in 17 years at the club. If not for World War I his career may have been more successful. He worked as a physical education instructor during the conflict.

During his career, Fleming had a style of football boot named after him.

International career
Fleming remains the only Swindon player to have represented England at senior level while playing for the club - gaining 11 caps between 1909 and 1914.

Legacy

Fleming Way in Swindon, close to the County Ground, is named after him and a statue of him stands inside the foyer of Swindon Town at the County Ground. In 2019 Swindon Heritage unveiled a blue plaque to Fleming on his former home in Durham Street.

Around 2009 video footage of Fleming's playing was discovered.

Family
Harold Fleming was the son of Fredrick Henry Fleming (born 19 May 1850), and had one brother (Fredrick Edwin) and two sisters (Ella and Edith). All four went on to have children, including a daughter (Meriel) for Harold.

Career statistics

Club

International
Scores and results list England's goal tally first, score column indicates score after each Fleming goal.

References

External links
Tribute from local newspaper

1887 births
1955 deaths
Military personnel from Wiltshire
People from Downton, Wiltshire
Swindon Town F.C. players
English footballers
England international footballers
Association football inside forwards
British military personnel of World War I
20th-century British military personnel